Jana Čepelová was the defending champion, having won the event in 2013, however she lost in the first round to Alexandra Panova.

Alexandra Dulgheru won the title, defeating Kimiko Date-Krumm in the final, 6–3, 6–4.

Seeds

Main draw

Finals

Top half

Bottom half

References 
 Main draw

Al Habtoor Tennis Challenge - Singles
Al Habtoor Tennis Challenge
2014 in Emirati tennis